Mao Mao: Heroes of Pure Heart is an American animated television series created by Parker Simmons for Cartoon Network. Produced by Cartoon Network Studios and Titmouse, it premiered on July 1, 2019. The show is based on the independent teaser short I Love You Mao Mao, which Simmons had initially produced for the annual Titmouse Inc. "5-Second Day" on February 21, 2014 and subsequently posted on Newgrounds. The series was renewed for a second season on July 23, 2020. 

On January 1, 2021, Mao Mao: Heroes of Pure Heart was added to the HBO Max streaming service. On August 18, 2022, it was removed from the service as a result of the Warner Bros. Discovery merger. Cartoon Network subsequently removed all references to the show from their official websites, YouTube channels, and Twitter feeds. On October 14, 2022, Cartoon Network restored videos of the show to their YouTube channel and references to the show on their Twitter.  However, the show remains missing from the Cartoon Network website.

Plot 
Mao Mao: Heroes of Pure Heart centers on its coming-of-age story, with the title character, Mao Mao, a daring cat who has high intentions for action and adventure. During one of his adventures, he gets stuck in a cute and cuddly town called Pure Heart Valley with his co-hero Badgerclops, a cyborg-armed badger, and meets Adorabat, a cute little bat. Together, the three go on adventures to protect their citizens of Pure Heart Valley from the forces of evil while they find a way to fix the Ruby Pure Heart to its original state.

Characters

Main characters 
 Mao Mao, full name Mao Mao Mao, (voiced by Parker Simmons), a righteous yet uptight cat who gets stuck in Pure Heart Valley where he spends time helping the citizens while also finding a way to fix the Ruby Pure Heart which he inadvertently broke in the first place.
Colleen Clinkenbeard voices a young Mao Mao.
 Badgerclops (voiced by Griffith Kimmins), a sassy cyborg badger with a robotic arm and an eyepatch, and Mao Mao's co-hero and partner.
 Adorabat (voiced by Lika Leong), a cute, blue, five-year-old bat with a yellow heart symbol and peg leg in place of her right leg.

Villains

Sky Pirates 
 Orangusnake (voiced by Christopher McCulloch), an orangutan-snake hybrid pirate captain who wants to steal the Ruby Pure Heart to take over the world. He is actually a criminal duo named Coby (snake) and Tanner (orangutan) who after a fateful encounter with Mao Mao and Bao Bao decided to combine themselves to become the greatest villain in the world.
 Ramaraffe (voiced by Debra Wilson), a female cybernetic giraffe pirate with the ability to stretch her neck. She has been seen to be good at thinking of plans.
 Boss Hosstrich (voiced by Christopher McCulloch), a cybernetic ostrich pirate with a southern accent and attire. He has the ability to shoot eggs from a cannon on his chest and is quite a gentleman. He got into a manners battle with King Snugglemagne.
 Ratarang (voiced by Parker Simmons), a small rat pirate that can turn into a boomerang, who often talks about his mama.
 Beef Master, a large water buffalo with a necklace made of bones. Fell off the ship.
 Thunder Fist, a gorilla that can produce electricity from his hands. Fell off the ship.
 Steel Wing (voiced by Tommy Blacha), a wyvern with literal metal wings. Fell off the ship due to his wings being too heavy for flight.

Thicket Thieves 
 Tiny Toad (voiced by Mark Sheppard), the leader who is a cyborg frog with a monocle and a heavy English accent.
 Bullmozer (voiced by Simmons), a mole with cybernetic arms and glasses.
 Ratracer (voiced by Lisa O'Hare), a female rat with a wheel instead of legs.

Others 
 Rufus (voiced by Julian Barratt), a sly and cunning fox who swindles the Sweetypies of Pure Heart Valley.
 Reggie (voiced by Rich Fulcher), a raccoon and Rufus' sidekick.

Supporting characters

Pure Heart Valley Residents 
 King Snugglemagne the 25th (voiced by Parker Simmons), the foppish lion king of Pure Heart Valley. He is vain and effeminate, but can be very manipulative and is shown to have a scandalous side to him as well.
 Scoops (voiced by Debra Wilson), a small donkey that runs the news in Pure Heart Valley.
 Camille (voiced by Debra Wilson), a chameleon and royal magic-user to Pure Heart Valley.
 Honey, a flying squirrel and Camille's silent apprentice.
 Chef Rhett (voiced by Tommy Blacha), the royal chef of Pure Heart Valley.
 Pinky (voiced by Griffith Kimmins), a small pink rhinoceros who is considered disturbing by the residents of Pure Heart Valley.
 Ketchup (voiced by Debra Wilson), a pink fluffy gopher with strange interests.
 Kevin (voiced by Griffith Kimmins), a small blue porcupine with no fingers. He is afraid of everything.
 Chubbum (voiced by Tommy Blacha), a frog who is very friendly. His father sounds exactly like Mao Mao.
 Lucky (voiced by Tommy Blacha), a green hamster with glasses.
 Gary (voiced by Tommy Blacha), a crocodile who works as a cameraman.
 Cluckins (voiced by Christopher McCulloch), a chicken. Despite his appearance, he is 30 years old.
 Slim Pigguns (voiced by Parker Simmons), a yellow pig who works as a pizza delivery man. He drives a monster truck.
 Chester Nutz (voiced by Griffith Kimmins), a tall brown porcupine. He is Kevin's older brother.
 Mail Mole (voiced by Chris Prynoski), a mole who is eager to get the job done.
 Ol' Blue (voiced by Tommy Blacha), a blue dog who is a citizen of Pure Heart Valley. He is also a therapist and not easily impressed.
 Marion (voiced by Debra Wilson), a horse in Pure Heart Valley who is always working out.
 Benny (voiced by Christopher McCulloch), a yellow dog who is a citizen of Pure Heart Valley and Penny's husband.
 Penny (voiced by Lika Leong), a pink dog who is a citizen of Pure Heart Valley and Benny's wife.
 Farmer Bun (voiced by Parker Simmons), a pink rabbit with a big orange hat in Pure Heart Valley. He works at a farm.
 Muffins (voiced by Debra Wilson), a mouse in Pure Heart Valley who bakes muffins. Adorabat does not like her.
 Silly Billy (voiced by Tommy Blacha), a violet elephant who is a news anchor in Pure Heart Valley.
 Clark Lockjaw (voiced by Lika Leong) a tiny blue seal who is a news reporter in Pure Heart Valley.
 Teacher (voiced by Andy Daly), the teacher at Adorabat's school in Pure Heart Valley.

Mao Mao's family 
 Shin Mao (voiced by Clancy Brown), Mao Mao's father, has a strained relationship with him. He gifted Mao Mao his golden sword while giving his sisters more impressive weapons. It is revealed that he is small like Mao Mao and ultimately learns to be more appreciative of his son.
 Brunhilde Mao, a large knight with a golden spear that can pierce anything.
 A ninja with a golden scarf that grants the wearer supersonic flight.
 A monk with a golden hat that can store infinite items.
 A martial artist with golden bangles that grant impenetrable defense.
 A sorcerer with golden eye contact that offers incredible sight.
 Mao Mao's mother, who once informed her son that his father was visiting.
 Uncle Jim Jim (voiced by Parker Simmons), Mao Mao's uncle who, despite being a spirit, is still technically alive and possibly a barbarian.
 Aunt Gloria, Mao Mao's aunt and a secondary character who appears in "Lonely Kid".
 Great-Great Paternal Grandfather Twig (voiced by Griffith Kimmins), Mao Mao's grandfather who was a sumo warrior.
 Great-Great Aunt Blackbeard (voiced by Colleen Clinkenbeard), Mao Mao's aunt who was a pirate warrior.

Others 
 Bao Bao (voiced by Chris Prynoski), Mao Mao's original partner, a common dog with a sword that does amazing tricks. Mao Mao is apparently unaware of the fact that he is capable of free-thinking as he "betrayed" (actually just got distracted by a butterfly) and left him. Mao Mao eventually accepts that he has a mind of his own.
 Bobo Chan (voiced by Debra Wilson), a young female monster that Badgerclops adopts after seeing her hatch from an egg. She quickly grows to full size after Badgerclops had to leave her in the wild and later on comes to the rescue when the Sky Pirates threaten to murder the heroes by tossing them off a cliff.
 Tanya Keys (voiced by Ming-Na Wen), a female tanuki and former friend of Mao Mao's who makes a living as a bounty hunter. She loves to mess with him, but wants him to be more carefree like her, despite Mao Mao's disgust of her being a vigilante rather than a hero. Just like in legends, she has the ability to transform herself and leaves into people and objects.
 Meditatin' Melvin (voiced by Dana Snyder), a meditating monkey who achieved the ability to astral project simply to get out of going to the dentist.
 Eugene (voiced by Randall Park), Adorabat's father who had a strained relationship with his daughter ever since his wife was murdered by a Cave Dragon before the events of the series.
 Sonara, Adorabat's deceased mother. A Cave Dragon from Pure Heart Valley attacked and killed her before the events of the series.

Episodes

Pilots (2014–16)

Season 1 (2019–20)

Production 
Cartoon Network announced on May 20, 2019 that they greenlit Mao Mao up for a full series alongside Tig n' Seek (originally titled Tiggle Winks). Eight new episodes were released on June 28, on the Cartoon Network app, website, and VOD. 

A second season was confirmed to be in production at the Cartoon Network Studios First Look Panel during the Comic-Con at Home event on July 23, 2020. However, production on the second season was stalled for years. In 2022, HBO Max removed the show from its streaming service and all references were removed from all forms of social media.

Broadcast 
The show debuted on Cartoon Network in the United States on July 1, 2019. It premiered on the same day in India on Cartoon Network HD+. The series premiered on July 13, 2019 on Cartoon Network Canada, while the series premiered on Teletoon on September 6, 2019. It premiered in France on January 4, 2020. The show debuted in Italy on Cartoon Network on January 6, 2020. Mao Mao: Heroes of Pure Heart premiered on Cartoon Network UK on March 2, 2020. It premiered on Cartoon Network Japan on April 5, 2020.

Reception 
The series won a 2021 Daytime Emmy Award for Outstanding Performer in an Animated Program.

Notes

References

External links 
 
 

2010s American animated television series
2019 American television series debuts
2020s American animated television series
2020 American television series endings
American children's animated action television series
American children's animated adventure television series
American children's animated comedy television series
American children's animated fantasy television series
American flash animated television series
Animated television series about cats
Animated television series about children
Anime-influenced Western animated television series
Television series by Cartoon Network Studios
Cartoon Network original programming
English-language television shows